George Fischer may refer to:

 George Drennen Fischer, American activist and spokesman for the National Education Association
 George R. Fischer (1937–2016), American underwater archaeologist
George Fischer Middle School

See also
George Fisher (disambiguation)